Gunter Sieberth (born in 1965) is a German oboist.

Life 
Sieberth comes from Meiningen in Thuringia. Afterwards he studied at the Hochschule für Musik Franz Liszt, Weimar with Axel Schmidt, solo English horn player in the MDR Leipzig Radio Symphony Orchestra. Already during his studies Sieberth was a substitute at the Staatskapelle Weimar, in 1988 he graduated with a diploma. Since then he has been 1st solo oboist of the Jena Philharmonic. He is also a lecturer for oboe at the Musikgymnasium Schloss Belvedere (Weimar) and in the master classes of the  tätig.

As a chamber musician he worked with the harpist Volker Sellmann and performed with the chamber orchestra Ludwig Güttler. He is also a member of the wind quintet of the Jena Philharmonic. In 2008 he founded the Trio Saphiro together with the Frankfurt harpist Bettina Linck and the Meiningen concert soprano Anna Gann.

Discography 
 2000: Orgeln in Thüringen – Jena, Volkshaus (Parzifal-Verlag)
 2004: Oboe & Harfe / Gunter Sieberth & Volker Sellmann (Christophorus)

External links 
 
 Gunter Sieberth auf der Seite der Jenaer Philharmonie

German classical oboists
1965 births
Living people
People from Meiningen